The 2010–11 Kentucky Wildcats women's basketball team represented the University of Kentucky in the 2010–11 NCAA Division I women's basketball season. The Wildcats, coached by Matthew Mitchell, were a member of the Southeastern Conference, and played their home games on campus at Memorial Coliseum—unlike UK's famous men's program, which plays off-campus at Rupp Arena in downtown Lexington.

Pre-season outlook
Kentucky was picked by the league's coaches to finish second in the SEC behind Tennessee. Victoria Dunlap, a 6'1 forward from Nashville, Tennessee, entered her senior season as one of the most decorated players in UK Hoops history. She was named the 2010 Southeastern Conference Player of the Year by The Associated Press and the league's coaches, and was one of the 10 State Farm All-Americans named by the Women's Basketball Coaches Association the year before, becoming UK's first All-American since Valerie Still in 1983. She was also on the Wade Trophy watch list awarded to the nation's top player. Dunlap was also picked to repeat as SEC Player of the Year by the league coaches, with eight of twelve votes. Sophomore guard A'dia Mathies made the All-SEC first team. The Lady Wildcats also had a large freshman class and Carly Marrow, a returning senior, was predicted to add experience to a young second string.

2010–11 roster
From the official UK women's basketball site:

2010–11 schedule

|-
!colspan=9 style="background:#273BE2; color:#FFFFFF;"| Exhibition

|-
!colspan=9 style="background:#273BE2; color:#FFFFFF;"| Non-Conference Regular Season

|-
!colspan=9 style="background:#273BE2; color:#FFFFFF;"| SEC Regular Season

|-
!colspan=9 style="background:#273BE2; color:#FFFFFF;"| SEC Tournament

|-
!colspan=9 style="background:#273BE2; color:#FFFFFF;"| NCAA Tournament

References

Kentucky Wildcats women's basketball seasons
Kentucky Wild
Kentucky Wild
Kentucky